The Davidson football team  (later known as the Davidson Wildcats) represented Davidson College in American football. The football program started in 1896 with a game against the Charlotte YMCA. After not fielding a team in 1897, the program played two games in 1898 and a six-game schedule in 1899. The team did not hire a coach until 1900 when John A. Brewin began his four-year tenure as head coach. This article covers the program's early years prior to the hiring of Brewin as the school's first head football coach.

1896

The 1896 Davidson football team was an American football team represented Davidson College as an independent during the 1896 college football season. The team compiled a 0–1 record and played just one match against the Charlotte YMCA on their own campus.

1898

The 1898 Davidson football team was an American football team represented Davidson College as an independent during the 1898 college football season. The team compiled a 1–1 record and played both games at Charlotte, North Carolina. After a loss to North Carolina, Davidson secured their first win in program history against South Carolina by a score of 5–0.

1899

The 1899 Davidson football team was an American football team represented Davidson College as an independent during the 1899 college football season, and the team compiled a 1–3–1. After they opened the season with three consecutive losses, Davidson had their first all time tie in program history with a scoreless game against North Carolina A&M.

References

Davidson Wildcats football seasons
1896 college football season
1898 college football season
1899 college football season